Aethes argyrospila is a species of moth of the family Tortricidae. It is found in Kurdistan Province of Iran and Turkey.

References

Moths described in 2005
argyrospila
Moths of Asia